Richard Twilley Porter (December 30, 1901 – September 24, 1974) was a Major League Baseball outfielder from –, for the Cleveland Indians and Boston Red Sox.

In 1930, he batted .350 with 43 doubles and 100 runs scored in only 119 games. He reached career highs in 1932 with 191 hits and 106 runs scored.

In 675 major league games, he had 11 home runs, 282 RBI, scored 426 runs and batted .308 (774-for-2515).
Before and after his major league career, he played 14 seasons for three teams in the International League, hitting .328 with 123 home runs.  He is a member of the International League Hall of Fame.

External links

1901 births
1974 deaths
Major League Baseball outfielders
Baseball players from Maryland
Cleveland Indians players
Boston Red Sox players
Toronto Maple Leafs (International League) managers
Baltimore Orioles (IL) players
Birmingham Barons managers
Newark Bears (IL) players
Syracuse Chiefs managers
Anniston Rams players